Cătălin Gheorghe Gogor (born 27 May 2001) is a Romanian professional footballer who plays as a defender.

Career statistics

Club

References

External links
 Cătălin Gogor at lpf.ro

2001 births
Living people
Romanian footballers
Romania youth international footballers
Association football defenders
Liga I players
FC Steaua București players
Liga II players
FC Unirea Constanța players
Liga III players
FC Steaua II București players